The Great Pyramid of Giza is the largest Egyptian pyramid and the tomb of Fourth Dynasty pharaoh Khufu. Built in the early 26th century BC during a period of around 27 years, the pyramid is the oldest of the Seven Wonders of the Ancient World, and the only one to remain largely intact. It is the most famous monument of the Giza pyramid complex, in the Pyramid Fields of the Memphis and its Necropolis UNESCO World Heritage Site, in Giza, Egypt. It is at the most Northern end of the line of the 3 Pyramids of Giza.

Over time, most of the smooth white limestone casing was removed, which lowered the pyramid's height to the present . What is seen today is the underlying core structure.

The Great Pyramid was built by quarrying an estimated 2.3 million large blocks weighing 6 million tonnes in total. The majority of stones are not uniform in size or shape and are only roughly dressed. The outside layers were bound together by mortar. Primarily local limestone from the Giza Plateau was used. Other blocks were imported by boat on the Nile: White limestone from Tura for the casing, and granite blocks from Aswan, weighing up to 80 tonnes, for the King's Chamber structure.

There are three known chambers inside the Great Pyramid. The lowest was cut into the bedrock, upon which the pyramid was built, but remained unfinished. The so-called Queen's Chamber and King's Chamber, that contains a granite sarcophagus, are above ground, within the pyramid structure. Khufu's vizier, Hemiunu (also called Hemon), is believed by some to be the architect of the Great Pyramid. Many varying scientific and alternative hypotheses attempt to explain the exact construction techniques.

The funerary complex around the pyramid consisted of two mortuary temples connected by a causeway (one close to the pyramid and one near the Nile), tombs for the immediate family and court of Khufu, including three smaller pyramids for Khufu's wives, an even smaller "satellite pyramid" and five buried solar barges (boats).

Attribution to Khufu 

Historically the Great Pyramid had been attributed to Khufu based on the words of authors of classical antiquity, first and foremost Herodotus and Diodorus Siculus. However, during the Middle Ages other people were credited with the construction of the pyramid as well, for example Joseph (Genesis), Nimrod or king Saurid ibn Salhouk.

In 1837 four additional Relieving Chambers were found above the King's Chamber after tunneling to them. The chambers, previously inaccessible, were covered in hieroglyphs of red paint. The workers who were building the pyramid had marked the blocks with the names of their gangs, which included the pharaoh's name (e.g.: “The gang, The white crown of Khnum-Khufu is powerful”). The names of Khufu were spelled out on the walls over a dozen times. Another of these graffiti was found by Goyon on an exterior block of the 4th layer of the pyramid. The inscriptions are comparable to those found at other sites of Khufu, such as the alabaster quarry at Hatnub or the harbor at Wadi al-Jarf, and are present in pyramids of other pharaohs as well.

Throughout the 20th century the cemeteries next to the pyramid were excavated. Family members and high officials of Khufu were buried in the East Field south of the causeway, and the West Field. Most notably the wives, children and grandchildren of Khufu, Hemiunu, Ankhaf and (the funerary cache of) Hetepheres I, mother of Khufu. As Hassan puts it: "From the early dynastic times, it was always the custom for the relatives, friends and courtiers to be buried in the vicinity of the king they had served during life. This was quite in accordance with the Egyptian idea of the Hereafter."

The cemeteries were actively expanded until the 6th dynasty and used less frequently afterwards. The earliest pharaonic name of seal impressions is that of Khufu, the latest of Pepi II. Worker graffiti was written on some of the stones of the tombs as well; for instance, "Mddw" (Horus name of Khufu) on the mastaba of Chufunacht, probably a grandson of Khufu.

Some inscriptions in the chapels of the mastabas (like the pyramid, their burial chambers were usually bare of inscriptions) mention Khufu or his pyramid. For instance, an inscription of Mersyankh III states that "Her mother [is the] daughter of the King of Upper and Lower Egypt Khufu." Most often these references are part of a title, for example, Snnw-ka, "Chief of the Settlement and Overseer of the Pyramid City of Akhet-Khufu" or Merib, "Priest of Khufu". Several tomb owners have a king's name as part of their own name (e.g. Chufudjedef, Chufuseneb, Merichufu). The earliest pharaoh alluded to in that manner at Giza is Snefru (Khufu's father).

In 1936 Hassan uncovered a stela of Amenhotep II near the Great Sphinx of Giza which implies the two larger pyramids were still attributed to Khufu and Khafre in the New Kingdom. It reads: "He yoked the horses in Memphis, when he was still young, and stopped at the Sanctuary of Hor-em-akhet (the Sphinx). He spent a time there in going round it, looking at the beauty of the Sanctuary of Khufu and Khafra the revered."

In 1954 two boat pits, one containing the Khufu ship, were discovered buried at the south foot of the pyramid. The cartouche of Djedefre was found on many of the blocks that covered the boat pits. As the successor and eldest son he would have presumably been responsible for the burial of Khufu. The second boat pit was examined in 1987; excavation work started in 2010. Graffiti on the stones included 4 instances of the name "Khufu", 11 instances of "Djedefre", a year (in reign, season, month and day), measurements of the stone, various signs and marks, and a reference line used in construction, all done in red or black ink.

During excavations in 2013 the Diary of Merer was found at Wadi al-Jarf. It documents the transportation of white limestone blocks from Tura to the Great Pyramid, which is mentioned by its original name Akhet Khufu (with a pyramid determinative) dozens of times. It details that the stones were accepted at She Akhet-Khufu ("the pool of the pyramid Horizon of Khufu") and Ro-She Khufu (“the entrance to the pool of Khufu”) which were under supervision of Ankhhaf, half brother and vizier of Khufu, as well as owner of the largest mastaba of the Giza East Field.

Age 

The Great Pyramid has been determined to be about 4600 years old by two principal approaches: indirectly, through its attribution to Khufu and his chronological age, based on archaeological and textual evidence; and directly, via radiocarbon dating of organic material found in the pyramid and included in its mortar.

Historical chronology 

In the past the Great Pyramid was dated by its attribution to Khufu alone, putting the construction of the Great Pyramid within his reign. Hence dating the pyramid was a matter of dating Khufu and the 4th dynasty. The relative sequence and synchronicity of events is the focal point of this method.

Absolute calendar dates are derived from an interlocked network of evidence, the backbone of which are the lines of succession known from ancient king lists and other texts. The reign lengths from Khufu to known points in the earlier past are summated, bolstered with genealogical data, astronomical observations, and other sources. As such, the historical chronology of Egypt is primarily a political chronology, thus independent from other types of archaeological evidence like stratigraphies, material culture, or radiocarbon dating.

The majority of recent chronological estimates date Khufu and his pyramid roughly between 2700 and 2500 BC.

Radiocarbon dating 
Mortar was used generously in the Great Pyramid's construction. In the mixing process ashes from fires were added to the mortar, organic material that could be extracted and radiocarbon dated. A total of 46 samples of the mortar were taken in 1984 and 1995, making sure they were clearly inherent to the original structure and could not have been incorporated at a later date. The results were calibrated to 2871–2604 BC. The old wood problem is thought to be mainly responsible for the 100–300 year offset, since the age of the organic material was determined, not when it was last used. A reanalysis of the data gave a completion date for the pyramid between 2620 and 2484 BC, based on the younger samples.

In 1872 Waynman Dixon opened the lower pair of "Air-Shafts", previously closed at both ends, by chiseling holes into the walls of the Queen's Chamber. One of the objects found within was a cedar plank, which came into possession of James Grant, a friend of Dixon. After inheritance it was donated to the Museum of Aberdeen in 1946, however it had broken into pieces and was filed incorrectly. Lost in the vast museum collection, it was only rediscovered in 2020, when it was radiocarbon dated to 3341–3094 BC. Being over 500 years older than Khufu's chronological age, Abeer Eladany suggests that the wood originated from the center of a long-lived tree or had been recycled for many years prior to being deposited in the pyramid.

History of dating Khufu and the Great Pyramid 
Circa 450 BC Herodotus attributed the Great Pyramid to Cheops (Hellenization of Khufu), yet erroneously placed his reign following the Ramesside period. Manetho, around 200 years later, composed an extensive list of Egyptian kings which he divided into dynasties, assigning Khufu to the 4th. However, after phonetic changes in the Egyptian language and consequently the Greek translation, "Cheops" had transformed into "Souphis" (and similar versions).

Greaves, in 1646, reported the great difficulty of ascertaining a date for the pyramid's construction based on the lacking and conflicting historic sources. Because of the aforementioned differences in spelling, he didn't recognize Khufu on Manetho's king list (as transcribed by Africanus and Eusebius), hence he relied on Herodotus' incorrect account. Summating the duration of lines of succession, Greaves concluded the year 1266 BC to be the beginning of Khufu's reign.

Two centuries later, some of the gaps and uncertainties in Manetho's chronology had been cleared by discoveries such as the King Lists of Turin, Abydos, and Karnak. The names of Khufu found within the Great Pyramid's Relieving Chambers in 1837 helped to make clear that Cheops and Souphis are, in fact, one and the same. Thus the Great Pyramid was recognized to have been built in the 4th dynasty. The dating among Egyptologists still varied by multiple centuries (around 4000–2000 BC), depending on methodology, preconceived religious notions (such as the biblical deluge) and which source they thought was more credible.

Estimates significantly narrowed in the 20th century, most being within 250 years of each other, around the middle of the third millennium BC. The newly developed radiocarbon dating method confirmed that the historic chronology was approximately correct. It is, however, still not a fully appreciated method due to larger margins or error, calibration uncertainties and the problem of inbuilt age (time between growth and final usage) in plant material, including wood. Furthermore, astronomical alignments have been suggested to coincide with the time of construction.

Egyptian chronology continues to be refined and data from multiple disciplines have started to be factored in, such as luminescence dating, radiocarbon dating, and dendrochronology. For instance, Ramsey et al. included over 200 radiocarbon samples in their model.

Historiographical record

Classical antiquity

Herodotus

The ancient Greek historian Herodotus, writing in the 5th century BC, is one of the first major authors to mention the pyramid. In the second book of his work The Histories, he discusses the history of Egypt and the Great Pyramid. This report was created more than 2000 years after the structure was built, meaning that Herodotus obtained his knowledge mainly from a variety of indirect sources, including officials and priests of low rank, local Egyptians, Greek immigrants, and Herodotus's own interpreters. Accordingly, his explanations present themselves as a mixture of comprehensible descriptions, personal descriptions, erroneous reports, and fantastical legends; as a result, many of the speculative errors and confusions about the monument can be traced back to Herodotus and his work.

Herodotus writes that the Great Pyramid was built by Khufu (Hellenized as Cheops) who, he erroneously relays, ruled after the Ramesside Period (the 19th dynasty and the 20th dynasty). Khufu was a tyrannical king, Herodotus claims, which may explain the Greek's view that such buildings can only come about through cruel exploitation of the people. Herodotus states that gangs of 100,000 labourers worked on the building in three-month shifts, taking 20 years to build. In the first ten years a wide causeway was erected, which, according to Herodotus, was almost as impressive as the construction of the pyramids themselves.

Underground chambers were made on the hill whereon the pyramids stand. These were intended to be burial places for Khufu himself and were encompassed with water by a channel brought in from the Nile. Herodotus later states that at the Pyramid of Khafre (located beside the Great Pyramid) the Nile flows through a built passage to an island in which Khufu is buried. Hawass interprets this to be a reference to the "Osiris Shaft" which is located at the causeway of Khafre, south of the Great Pyramid.

Herodotus described an inscription on the outside of the pyramid which, according to his translators, indicated the amount of radishes, garlic and onions that the workers would have eaten while working on the pyramid. This could be a note of restoration work that Khaemweset, son of Rameses II, had carried out. Apparently, Herodotus’ companions and interpreters could not read the hieroglyphs or deliberately gave him false information.

Diodorus Siculus
Between 60 and 56 BC, the ancient Greek historian Diodorus Siculus visited Egypt and later dedicated the first book of his Bibliotheca historica to the land, its history, and its monuments, including the Great Pyramid. Diodorus's work was inspired by historians of the past, but he also distanced himself from Herodotus, who Diodorus claims tells marvelous tales and myths. Diodorus presumably drew his knowledge from the lost work of Hecataeus of Abdera, and like Herodotus, he also places the builder of the pyramid, "Chemmis," after Ramses III. According to his report, neither Chemmis (Khufu) nor Cephren (Khafre) were buried in their pyramids, but rather in secret places, for fear that the people ostensibly forced to build the structures would seek out the bodies for revenge. With this assertion, Diodorus strengthened the connection between pyramid building and slavery.

About the construction of the pyramid he notes that it was built with the help of ramps since no lifting tools had yet been invented. Nothing was left of the ramps, as they were removed after the pyramids were completed. He estimated the number of workers necessary to erect the Great Pyramid at 360,000 and the construction time at 20 years. Similar to Herodotus, Diodorus also claims that the side of the pyramid is inscribed with writing that "[set] forth [the price of] vegetables and purgatives for the workmen there were paid out over sixteen hundred talents."

Strabo

The Greek geographer, philosopher, and historian Strabo visited Egypt around 25 BC, shortly after Egypt was annexed by the Romans. In his work Geographica, he argues that the pyramids were the burial place of kings, but he does not mention which king was buried in the structure. Strabo also mentions: "At a moderate height in one of the sides is a stone, which may be taken out; when that is removed, there is an oblique passage to the tomb." This statement has generated much speculation, as it suggests that the pyramid could be entered at this time.

Pliny the Elder

The Roman writer Pliny the Elder, writing in the first century AD, argued that the Great Pyramid had been raised, either "to prevent the lower classes from remaining unoccupied", or as a measure to prevent the pharaoh's riches from falling into the hands of his rivals or successors. Pliny does not speculate as to the pharaoh in question, explicitly noting that "accident [has] consigned to oblivion the names of those who erected such stupendous memorials of their vanity". 

In pondering how the stones could be transported to such a vast height he gives two explanations: That either vast mounds of nitre and salt were heaped up against the pyramid which were then melted away with water redirected from the river. Or, that "bridges" were constructed, their bricks afterwards distributed for erecting houses of private individuals, arguing that the level of the river is too low for canals to ever bring water up to the pyramid. Pliny also recounts how "in the interior of the largest Pyramid there is a well, eighty-six cubits [] deep, which communicates with the river, it is thought". Further, he describes a method discovered by Thales of Miletus for ascertaining the pyramid's height by measuring its shadow.

Late antiquity and the Middle Ages

During late antiquity, a misinterpretation of the pyramids as "Joseph's granary" began to gain in popularity. The first textual evidence of this connection is found in the travel narratives of the female Christian pilgrim Egeria, who records that on her visit between 381 and 384 AD, "in the twelve-mile stretch between Memphis and Babylonia [= Old Cairo] are many pyramids, which Joseph made in order to store corn." Ten years later the usage is confirmed in the anonymous travelogue of seven monks that set out from Jerusalem to visit the famous ascetics in Egypt, wherein they report that they "saw Joseph's granaries, where he stored grain in biblical times." 

This late 4th century usage is further confirmed in the geographical treatise Cosmographia, written by Julius Honorius around 376 AD, which explains that the Pyramids were called the "granaries of Joseph". This reference from Julius is important, as it indicates that the identification was starting to spread out from pilgrim's travelogues. In 530 AD, Stephanos of Byzantium added more to this idea when he wrote in his Ethnica that the word "pyramid" was connected to the Greek word πυρός (puros), meaning wheat.

In the seventh century AD, the Rashidun Caliphate conquered Egypt, ending several centuries of Romano-Byzantine rule. A few centuries later, in 820 AD, the Abbasid Caliph Al-Ma'mun (786–833) is said to have tunneled into the side of the structure and discovered the ascending passage and its connecting chambers. Around this time a Coptic legend gained popularity that claimed the antediluvian king Surid Ibn Salhouk had built the Pyramid. One legend in particular relates how, three hundred years prior to the Great Flood, Surid had a terrifying dream of the world's end, and so he ordered the construction of the pyramids so that they might house all the knowledge of Egypt and survive into the present. 

The most notable account of this legend was given by Al-Masudi (896–956) in his Akbar al-zaman, alongside imaginative tales about the pyramid, such as the story of a man who fell three hours down the pyramid's well and the tale of an expedition that discovered bizarre finds in the structure's inner chambers. Al-zaman also contains a report of Al-Ma'mun's entering the pyramid and discovering a vessel containing a thousand coins, which just so happened to account for the cost of opening the pyramid. (Some speculate that this story is true, but that the coins were planted by Al-Ma'mun to appease his workers, who were likely frustrated that they had found no treasure.)

In 987 AD, the Arab bibliographer Ibn al-Nadim relates a fantastical tale in his Al-Fihrist about a man who journeyed into the main chamber of a pyramid, which Bayard Dodge argues is the Great Pyramid. According to al-Nadim, the person in question saw a statue of a man holding a tablet and a woman holding a mirror. Supposedly, between the statues was a "stone vessel [with] a gold cover." Inside the vessel was "something like pitch," and when the explorer reached into the vessel "a gold receptacle happened to be inside." The receptacle, when taken from the vessel, was filled with "fresh blood," which quickly dried up. Ibn al-Nadim's work also claims that the bodies of a man and woman were discovered inside the pyramid in the "best possible state of preservation." 

The author al-Kaisi, in his work the Tohfat Alalbab, retells the story of Al-Ma'mun's entry but with the additional discovery of "an image of a man in green stone", which when opened revealed a body dressed in jewel-encrusted gold armor. Al-Kaisi claims to have seen the case from which the body was taken, and asserts that it was located at the king's palace in Cairo. He also writes that he himself entered into the pyramid and discovered myriad preserved bodies.

The Arab polymath Abd al-Latif al-Baghdadi (1163–1231) studied the pyramid with great care, and in his Account of Egypt, he praises them as works of engineering genius. In addition to measuring the structure, alongside the other pyramids at Giza, al-Baghdadi also writes that the structures were surely tombs, although he thought the Great Pyramid was used for the burial of Agathodaimon or Hermes. Al-Baghdadi ponders whether the pyramid pre-dated the Great flood as described in Genesis, and even briefly entertained the idea that it was a pre-Adamic construction. A few centuries later, the Islamic historian Al-Maqrizi (1364–1442) compiled lore about the Great Pyramid in his Al-Khitat. In addition to reasserting that Al-Ma'mun breached the structure in 820 AD, Al-Maqrizi's work also discusses the sarcophagus in the coffin chambers, explicitly noting that the pyramid was a grave. 

By the Late Middle Ages, the Great Pyramid had gained a reputation as a haunted structure. Others feared entering, because it was home to animals like bats.

Construction

Preparation of the site 
A hillock forms the base on which the pyramid stands. It was cut back into steps and only a strip around the perimeter was leveled, which has been measured to be horizontal and flat to within .

Along the sides of the base platform a series of holes are cut in the bedrock. Lehner hypothesizes that they held wooden posts used for alignment. Edwards, among others, suggested the usage of water for evening the base, although it is unclear how practical and workable such a system would be.

Materials 
The Great Pyramid consists of an estimated 2.3 million blocks. Approximately 5.5 million tonnes of limestone, 8,000 tonnes of granite, and 500,000 tonnes of mortar were used in the construction.

Most of the blocks were quarried at Giza just south of the pyramid, an area now known as the Central Field. They are a particular type of nummulitic limestone formed of the fossils of thousands of prehistoric shell creatures, whose small disc form can still be seen in some of the pyramid's blocks upon close inspection. Other fossils have been found in the blocks and other structures on the site, including fossilized shark teeth. In 2013, rolls of papyrus called the Diary of Merer were discovered, written by a supervisor of the deliveries of limestone and other construction materials from Tura to Giza in the 27th year of Khufu's reign.

The largest, weighing 25 to 80 tonnes, form the ceilings of the "King's chamber" and the "relieving chambers" above it. Ancient Egyptians cut stone into rough blocks by hammering grooves into natural stone faces, inserting wooden wedges, then soaking these with water. As the water was absorbed, the wedges expanded, breaking off workable chunks. Once the blocks were cut, they were carried by boat on the Nile River to the pyramid.

Workforce 
The Greeks believed that slave labour was used, but modern discoveries made at nearby workers' camps associated with construction at Giza suggest that it was built by thousands of conscript laborers.

Worker graffiti found at Giza suggest haulers were divided into zau (singular za), groups of 40 men, consisting of four sub-units that each had an "Overseer of Ten".

As to the question of how over two million blocks could have been cut within Khufu's lifetime, stonemason Franck Burgos conducted an archaeological experiment based on an abandoned quarry of Khufu discovered in 2017. Within it, an almost completed block and the tools used for cutting it had been uncovered: hardened arsenic copper chisels, wooden mallets, ropes and stone tools. In the experiment replicas of these were used to cut a block weighing about 2.5 tonnes (the average block size used for the Great Pyramid). It took four workers 4 days (with each working 6 hours a day) to excavate it. The initially slow progress sped up six times when the stone was wetted with water. Based on the data, Burgos extrapolates that about 3,500 quarry-men could have produced the 250 blocks/day needed to complete the Great Pyramid in 27 years.

A construction management study conducted in 1999, in association with Mark Lehner and other Egyptologists, had estimated that the total project required an average workforce of about 13,200 people and a peak workforce of roughly 40,000.

Surveys and design 

The first precise measurements of the pyramid were made by Egyptologist Flinders Petrie in 1880–1882, published as The Pyramids and Temples of Gizeh. On the contrary, core blocks were only roughly shaped, with rubble inserted between larger gaps. Mortar was used to bind the outer layers together and fill gaps and joints. 

The block height and weight tends to get progressively smaller towards the top.

The accuracy of the pyramid's perimeter is such that the four sides of the base have an average error of only  in length and the finished base was squared to a mean corner error of only 12 seconds of arc.

Ancient Egyptians used seked – how much run for one cubit of rise – to describe slopes. For the Great Pyramid a seked of  palms was chosen, a ratio of 14 up to 11 in.

Some Egyptologists suggest this slope was chosen because the ratio of perimeter to height (1760/280 cubits) equals 2π to an accuracy of better than 0.05 percent (corresponding to the well-known approximation of π as 22/7). Verner wrote, "We can conclude that although the ancient Egyptians could not precisely define the value of π, in practice they used it". Petrie concluded: "but these relations of areas and of circular ratio are so systematic that we should grant that they were in the builder's design". Others have argued that the ancient Egyptians had no concept of pi and would not have thought to encode it in their monuments and that the observed pyramid slope may be based on the seked choice alone.

Alignment to the cardinal directions 
The sides of the Great Pyramid's base are closely aligned to the four geographic (not magnetic) cardinal directions, deviating on average 3 minutes and 38 seconds of arc, or about a tenth of a degree. Several methods have been proposed for how the ancient Egyptians achieved this level of accuracy:

 The Solar Gnomon Method: The shadow of a vertical rod is tracked throughout a day. The shadow line is intersected by a circle drawn around the base of the rod. Connecting the intersecting points produces an east–west line. An experiment using this method resulted in lines being, on average, 2 minutes, 9 seconds off due east–west. Employing a pinhole produced much more accurate results (19 arc seconds off), whereas using an angled block as a shadow definer was less accurate (3′ 47″ off).
 The Pole Star Method: The polar star is tracked using a movable sight and fixed plumb line. Halfway between the maximum eastern and western elongations is true north. Thuban, the polar star during the Old Kingdom, was about two degrees removed from the celestial pole at the time.
 The Simultaneous Transit Method: The stars Mizar and Kochab appear on a vertical line on the horizon, close to true north around 2500 BC. They slowly and simultaneously shift east over time, which is used to explain the relative misalignment of the pyramids.

Construction theories

Many alternative, often contradictory, theories have been proposed regarding the pyramid's construction techniques. One mystery of the pyramid's construction is its planning. John Romer suggests that they used the same method that had been used for earlier and later constructions, laying out parts of the plan on the ground at a 1-to-1 scale. He writes that "such a working diagram would also serve to generate the architecture of the pyramid with precision unmatched by any other means".

He theorizes that such a saw could have been attached to a wooden trestle support and possibly used in conjunction with vegetable oil, cutting sand, emery or pounded quartz to cut the blocks, which would have required the labour of at least a dozen men to operate it.

Exterior

Casing

At completion, the Great Pyramid was cased entirely in white limestone. Precisely worked blocks were placed in horizontal layers and carefully fitted together with mortar, their outward faces cut at a slope and smoothed to a high degree. Together they created four uniform surfaces, angled at 51°50'40" (a Seked of  palms). Unfinished casing blocks of the pyramids of Menkaure and Henutsen at Giza suggest that the front faces were smoothed only after the stones were laid, with chiseled seams marking correct positioning and where the superfluous rock would have to be trimmed off.

The height of the horizontal layers is not uniform but varies considerably. An irregular pattern is noticeable when looking at the sizes in sequence, where layer height declines steadily only to rise sharply again.

So-called "backing stones" supported the casing which were (unlike core blocks) precisely dressed as well and bound to the casing with mortar. Now, these stones give the structure its visible appearance, following the partial dismantling of the pyramid in the Middle Ages. Amidst earthquakes in northern Egypt, workers (perhaps the descendants of those who served Al-Mamun) stripped away many of the outer casing stones, which were said to have been carted away by Bahri Sultan An-Nasir Nasir-ad-Din al-Hasan in 1356 for use in nearby Cairo. 

Many more casing stones were removed from the site by Muhammad Ali Pasha in the early 19th century to build the upper portion of his Alabaster Mosque in Cairo. Later explorers reported massive piles of rubble at the base of the pyramids left over from the continuing collapse of the casing stones, which were subsequently cleared away during continuing excavations of the site. Today a few of the casing stones from the lowest course can be seen in situ on each side, with the best preserved on the north below the entrances, excavated by Vyse in 1837.

The mortar was chemically analyzed and contains organic inclusions (mostly charcoal), samples of which were radiocarbon dated to 2871–2604 BC. It has been theorized that the mortar enabled the masons to set the stones exactly by providing a level bed.

It has been suggested that some or all of the casing stones were cast in place, rather than quarried and moved, yet archaeological evidence and petrographic analysis indicate this was not the case.

Petrie noted in 1880 that the sides of the pyramid, as we see them today, are "very distinctly hollowed" and that "each side has a sort of groove specially down the middle of the face", which he reasoned was a result of increased casing thickness in these areas. A laser scanning survey in 2005 confirmed the existence of the anomalies, which can be, to some degree, attributed to damaged and removed stones. Under certain lighting conditions and with image enhancement the faces can appear to be split, leading to speculation that the pyramid had been intentionally constructed eight-sided.

Pyramidion and missing tip 
The pyramid was once topped by a capstone known as a pyramidion. The material from which it was made is subject to much speculation; limestone, granite or basalt are commonly proposed, while in popular culture it is often solid gold, gilded or electrum. All known 4th dynasty pyramidia (of the Red Pyramid, Satellite Pyramid of Khufu (G1-d) and Queen's Pyramid of Menkaure (G3-a)) are of white limestone and were not gilded. Only from the 5th dynasty onward is there evidence of gilded capstones; for instance, a scene on the causeway of the Sahure speaks of the "white gold pyramidion of the pyramid Sahure’s Soul Shines".

The Great Pyramid's pyramidion was lost in antiquity, as Pliny the Elder and later authors report a platform on its summit. Now, the pyramid is about  shorter than it was when intact, with about 1,000 tonnes of material missing from the top. 

In 1874 a mast was installed on the top by the Scottish astronomer Sir David Gill who, whilst returning from work involving observing a rare Venus transit, was invited to survey Egypt and began by surveying the Great Pyramid. His results measuring the pyramid were accurate to within 1 mm and the survey mast is still in place to this day.

Interior
The internal structure consists of three main chambers (the King's-, Queen's- and Subterranean Chamber), the Grand Gallery and various corridors and shafts.

There are two entrances into the pyramid: the original and a forced passage, which meet at a junction. From there, one passage descends into the Subterranean Chamber, while the other ascends to the Grand Gallery. From the beginning of the gallery three paths can be taken:

 a vertical shaft that leads down, past a grotto, to meet the descending passage
 a horizontal corridor leading to the Queen's Chamber
 and the path up the gallery itself to the King's Chamber that contains the sarcophagus.

Both the King's and Queen's Chamber have a pair of small "air-shafts". Above the King's Chamber are a series of five Relieving Chambers.

Entrances

Original entrance 
The height of that layer –  – corresponds to the size of the entrance tunnel which is commonly called the Descending Passage. According to Strabo (64–24 BC) a movable stone could be raised to enter this sloping corridor, however it is not known if it was a later addition or original.

A row of double chevrons diverts weight away from the entrance. Several of these chevron blocks are now missing, as indicated by the slanted faces on which they once rested.

Numerous, mostly modern, graffiti is cut into the stones around the entrance. Most notable is a large, square text of hieroglyphs carved in honor of Frederick William IV, by Karl Richard Lepsius's Prussian expedition to Egypt in 1842.

North Face Corridor 

Its ceiling is formed by large chevrons, like those visible above the original entrance and also similar to Relieving Chambers.

Robbers' Tunnel
Today tourists enter the Great Pyramid via the Robbers' Tunnel, which was long ago cut straight through the masonry of the pyramid. After running more-or-less straight and horizontal for  it turns sharply left to encounter the blocking stones in the Ascending Passage. It is possible to enter the Descending Passage from this point but access is usually forbidden.

The origin of this Robbers' Tunnel is the subject of much scholarly discussion. According to tradition the opening was made around 820 AD by Caliph al-Ma'mun's workmen with a battering ram. The digging dislodged the stone in the ceiling of the Descending Passage which hid the entrance to the Ascending Passage, and the noise of that stone falling, then sliding down the Descending Passage alerted them to the need to turn left. Unable to remove these stones, the workmen tunneled upwards beside them through the softer limestone of the Pyramid until they reached the Ascending Passage.

Due to a number of historical and archaeological discrepancies, many scholars (with Antoine de Sacy perhaps being the first) contend that this story is apocryphal. They argue that it is much more likely that the tunnel had been carved shortly after the pyramid was initially sealed. This tunnel, the scholars continue, was then resealed (likely during the Ramesside Restoration), and it was this plug that al-Ma'mun's ninth-century expedition cleared away. This theory is furthered by the report of patriarch Dionysius I Telmaharoyo, who claimed that before al-Ma'mun's expedition, there already existed a breach in the pyramid's north face that extended into the structure  before hitting a dead end. This suggests that some sort of robber's tunnel predated al-Ma'mun, and that the caliph simply enlarged it and cleared it of debris.

Descending Passage 
From the original entrance, a passage descends through the masonry of the pyramid and then into the bedrock beneath it, ultimately leading to the Subterranean Chamber.

Its angle of 26°26'46" corresponds to a ratio of 1 to 2 (rise over run).

After , the lower end of the Ascending Passage is reached; a square hole in the ceiling, which is blocked by granite stones and might have originally been concealed. To circumvent these hard stones, a short tunnel was excavated that meets the end of the Robbers' Tunnel. This was expanded over time and fitted with stairs.

The passage continues to descend for another , now through bedrock instead of the pyramid superstructure. Lazy guides used to block off this part with rubble to avoid having to lead people down and back up the long shaft, until around 1902 when Covington installed a padlocked iron grill-door to stop this practice. Near the end of this section, on the west wall, is the connection to the vertical shaft that leads up to the Grand Gallery.

A recess is located towards the end of the western wall, slightly larger than the tunnel, the ceiling of which is irregular and undressed.

Subterranean Chamber 

The Subterranean Chamber, or "Pit", is the lowest of the three main chambers and the only one dug into the bedrock beneath the pyramid.

The western half of the room, apart from the ceiling, is unfinished, with trenches left behind by the quarry-men running east to west. A niche was cut into the northern half of the west wall. The only access, through the Descending Passage, lies on the eastern end of the north wall.

Although seemingly known in antiquity, according to Herodotus and later authors, its existence had been forgotten in the Middle Ages until rediscovery in 1817, when Giovanni Caviglia cleared the rubble blocking the Descending Passage.

A Greek or Roman character was found on its ceiling with the light of a candle, suggesting that the chamber had indeed been accessible during Classical antiquity.

In the middle of the eastern half is alarge hole called a Pit Shaft or Perring's Shaft. No chamber was discovered after Perring and his workers had spent one and a half years penetrating the bedrock to the then water level of the Nile, some  further down. 

The rubble produced during this operation was deposited throughout the chamber. Petrie, visiting in 1880, found the shaft to be partially filled with rainwater that had rushed down the Descending Passage. In 1909, when the Edgar brothers' surveying activities were encumbered by the material, they moved the sand and smaller stones back into the shaft, leaving the upper part clear. The deep, modern shaft is sometimes mistaken to be part of the original design.

Ludwig Borchardt suggested that the Subterranean Chamber was originally planned to be the burial place for pharaoh Khufu, but that it was abandoned during construction in favour of a chamber higher up in the pyramid.

Ascending Passage 

The Ascending Passage connects the Descending Passage to the Grand Gallery.

The lower end of the shaft is plugged by three granite stones, which were slid down from the Grand Gallery to seal the tunnel. The uppermost is heavily damaged, hence it is shorter. The end of the Robbers' Tunnel concludes slightly below the stones, so a short tunnel was dug around them to gain access to the Descending Passage, since the surrounding limestone is considerably softer and easier to work.

Most of the joints between the blocks of the walls run perpendicular to the floor, with two exceptions. Firstly, those in the lower third of the corridor are vertical. Secondly, the three girdle stones that are inserted near the middle (about 10 cubits apart) presumably stabilize the tunnel.

Well Shaft and Grotto 

The Well Shaft (also known as the Service Shaft or Vertical Shaft) links the lower end of the Grand Gallery to the bottom of the Descending Passage, about  further down.

It takes a winding and indirect course. The upper half goes through the nucleus masonry of the pyramid. Another vertical section descends further, which is partially lined with masonry that has been broken through to a cavity known as the Grotto. The final section of  connects it to the Descending Passage, running almost horizontally. The builders evidently had trouble aligning the lower exit.

The purpose of the shaft is commonly explained as a ventilation shaft for the Subterranean Chamber and as an escape shaft for the workers who slid the blocking stones of the Ascending Passage into place.

The Grotto is a natural limestone cave that was likely filled with sand and gravel before construction, before being hollowed out by looters. A granite block rests in it that likely originated from the portcullis that once sealed the King's Chamber.

Queen's Chamber

The Horizontal Passage links the Grand Gallery to the Queen's Chamber. Five pairs of holes at the start suggest the tunnel was once concealed with slabs that laid flush with the gallery floor. Half of the west-wall consists of two layers that have atypically continuous vertical joints. Dormion suggests the entrances to magazines laid here and have been filled in.

The Queen's Chamber is exactly halfway between the north and south faces of the pyramid.

Shafts were discovered in the north and south walls of the Queen's Chamber in 1872 by British engineer Waynman Dixon, who believed shafts similar to those in the King's Chamber must also exist. The shafts were not connected to the outer faces of the pyramid or the Queen's Chamber; their purpose is unknown. In one shaft Dixon discovered a ball of diorite, a bronze hook of unknown purpose and a piece of cedar wood. The first two objects are now in the British Museum. The latter was lost until recently when it was found at the University of Aberdeen. It has since been radiocarbon dated to 3341–3094 BC. The northern shaft's angle of ascent fluctuates and at one point turns 45 degrees to avoid the Great Gallery. The southern shaft is perpendicular to the pyramid's slope.

The shafts in the Queen's Chamber were explored in 1993 by the German engineer Rudolf Gantenbrink using a crawler robot he designed, Upuaut 2. The National Geographic Society created a similar robot which, in September 2002, drilled a small hole in the southern door only to find another stone slab behind it. The northern passage, which was difficult to navigate because of its twists and turns, was also found to be blocked by a slab.

Research continued in 2011 with the Djedi Project which used a fibre-optic "micro snake camera" that could see around corners. With this, they were able to penetrate the first door of the southern shaft through the hole drilled in 2002, and view all the sides of the small chamber behind it. They discovered hieroglyphics written in red paint. Egyptian mathematics researcher Luca Miatello stated that the markings read "121" – the length of the shaft in cubits. The Djedi team were also able to scrutinize the inside of the two copper "handles" embedded in the door, which they now believe to be for decorative purposes. They additionally found the reverse side of the "door" to be finished and polished, which suggests that it was not put there just to block the shaft from debris, but rather for a more specific reason.

Grand Gallery

It has been praised as a "truly spectacular example of stonemasonry".

It is roofed by slabs of stone laid at a slightly steeper angle than the floor so that each stone fits into a slot cut into the top of the gallery, like the teeth of a ratchet. The purpose was to have each block supported by the wall of the Gallery, rather than resting on the block beneath it, in order to prevent cumulative pressure.

At the upper end of the Gallery, on the eastern wall, is a hole near the roof that opens into a short tunnel by which access can be gained to the lowest of the Relieving Chambers.

There are 56 slots on the shelves, with 28 on each side. On each wall, 25 niches have been cut above the slots. The purpose of these slots is not known, but the central gutter in the floor of the Gallery, which is the same width as the Ascending Passage, has led to speculation that the blocking stones were stored in the Grand Gallery and the slots held wooden beams to restrain them from sliding down the passage. Jean-Pierre Houdin theorized that they held a timber frame that was used in combination with a trolley to pull the heavy granite blocks up the pyramid.

At the top of the gallery, there is a step onto a small horizontal platform where a tunnel leads through the Antechamber, once blocked by portcullis stones, into the King's Chamber.

The Big Void
In 2017, scientists from the ScanPyramids project discovered a large cavity above the Grand Gallery using muon radiography, which they called the "ScanPyramids Big Void". A research team, under the supervision of Professor Morishima Kunihiro at Nagoya University, used special nuclear emulsion detectors. Its length is at least  and its cross-section is similar to that of the Grand Gallery. Its existence was confirmed by independent detection with three different technologies: nuclear emulsion films, scintillator hodoscopes, and gas detectors. The purpose of the cavity is unknown and it is not accessible. Zahi Hawass speculates it may have been a gap used in the construction of the Grand Gallery, but the Japanese research team state that the void is completely different from previously identified construction spaces.

To verify and pinpoint the void, a team from Kyushu University, Tohoku University, the University of Tokyo and the Chiba Institute of Technology planned to rescan the structure with a newly developed muon detector in 2020. Their work was delayed by the COVID-19 pandemic.

Antechamber 

The last line of defense against intrusion was a small chamber designed to house portcullis blocking stones, called the Antechamber. It is cased almost entirely in granite and is situated between the upper end of the Grand Gallery and the King's Chamber. Three slots for portcullis stones line the east and west wall of the chamber. Each of them is topped with a semi-circular groove for a log, around which ropes could be spanned.

A corresponding set of four vertical grooves are on the south wall of the chamber, recesses that make space for the ropes.

The Antechamber has a design flaw: the space above them can be accessed, thus all but the last block can be circumvented. This was exploited by looters who punched a hole through the ceiling of the tunnel behind, gaining access to the King's Chamber. Later on, all three portcullis stones were broken and removed. Fragments of these blocks can be found in various locations in the pyramid (the Pit Shaft, the Original Entrance, the Grotto and the recess before the Subterranean Chamber).

King's Chamber
The King's Chamber is the upmost of the three main chambers of the pyramid. Its flat ceiling is about 11 cubits and 5 digits above the floor, formed by nine slabs of stone weighing in total about 400 tons. All the roof beams show cracks due to the chamber having settled .

The walls consist of five courses of blocks that are uninscribed, as was the norm for burial chambers of the 4th dynasty. The stones are precisely fitted together. The facing surfaces are dressed to varying degrees, with some displaying remains of bosses not entirely cut away. The back sides of the blocks were only roughly hewn to shape, as was usual with Egyptian hard-stone facade blocks, presumably to save work.

Sarcophagus 

The only object in the King's Chamber is a sarcophagus made of a single, hollowed-out granite block. When it was rediscovered in the Early Middle Ages, it was found broken open and any contents had already been removed. It is of the form common for early Egyptian sarcophagi, rectangular in shape with grooves to slide the now missing lid into place with three small holes for pegs to fixate it. The coffer was not perfectly smoothed, displaying various tool marks matching those of copper saws and tubular hand-drills.

The sarcophagus is too large to fit around the corner between the Ascending and Descending Passages, which indicates that it must have been placed in the chamber before the roof was put in place.

Air shafts 
In the north and south walls of the King's Chamber are two narrow shafts, commonly known as "air shafts". Both start out horizontally for the length of the granite blocks they go through before changing to an upwards direction. 

The southern shaft ascends at an angle of 45° with a slight curve westwards. One ceiling stone was found to be distinctly unfinished which Gantenbrink called a "Monday morning block". The northern shaft changes angle several times, shifting the path to the west, perhaps to avoid the Big Void. The builders apparently had trouble calculating the right angles, resulting in parts of the shaft being narrower. Now, they both commute to the exterior. If they originally penetrated the outer casing is unknown.

The purpose of these shafts is not clear: They were long believed by Egyptologists to be shafts for ventilation, but this idea has now been widely abandoned in favour of the shafts serving a ritualistic purpose associated with the ascension of the king's spirit to the heavens.

In 1992, as part of the Upuaut project, a ventilation system was installed in both air shafts of the King's Chamber.

Relieving chambers 

Above the roof of the King's Chamber are five compartments, named (from lowest upwards) "Davison's Chamber", "Wellington's Chamber", "Nelson's Chamber", "Lady Arbuthnot's Chamber", and "Campbell's Chamber".

They were presumably intended to safeguard the King's Chamber from the possibility of the roof collapsing under the weight of stone above; hence they are referred to as "Relieving Chambers".

The granite blocks that divide the chambers have flat bottom sides but roughly shaped top sides, giving all five chambers an irregular floor, but a flat ceiling, with the exception of the uppermost chamber which has a pointed limestone roof.

Nathaniel Davison is credited with the discovery of the lowest of these chambers in 1763, although a French merchant named Maynard informed him of its existence. It can be reached through an ancient passage that originates from the top of the south wall of the Grand Gallery. The upper four chambers were discovered in 1837 by Howard Vyse after discovering a crack in the ceiling of the first chamber. This allowed the insertion of a long reed, which, with the employment of gunpowder and boring rods, opened a tunnel upwards through the masonry. As no access shafts existed for the upper four chambers – unlike Davison's Chamber – they were completely inaccessible until this point.

Numerous graffiti of red ochre paint were found covering the limestone walls of all four newly discovered chambers. Apart from leveling lines and indication marks for masons, multiple hieroglyphic inscriptions spell out the names of work-gangs. Those names, which were also found in other Egyptian pyramids like that of Menkaure and Sahure, usually included the name of the pharaoh for whom they were working. The blocks must have received the inscriptions before the chambers became inaccessible during construction. Their orientation, often side-ways or upside down, and their sometimes being partially covered by blocks, seems to indicate that the stones were inscribed before being laid.

The inscriptions, correctly deciphered only decades after discovery, read as follows:

 "The gang, The Horus Mededuw-is-the-purifier-of-the-two-lands." Found once in relieving chamber 3. (Mededuw being Khufu's Horus name.)
 "The gang, The Horus Mededuw-is-pure" Found seven times in chamber 4.
 "The gang, Khufu-excites-love" Found once in chamber 5 (top chamber).
 “The gang, The-white-crown-of Khnumkhuwfuw-is-powerful” Found once in chambers 2 and 3, ten times in chamber 4 and twice in chamber 5. (Khnum-Khufu being Khufu's full birth name.)

Pyramid complex

The Great Pyramid is surrounded by a complex of several buildings, including small pyramids.

Temples and causeway 
Only some of the black basalt paving remains. There are only a few remnants of the causeway which linked the pyramid with the valley and the Valley Temple. The Valley Temple is buried beneath the village of Nazlet el-Samman; basalt paving and limestone walls have been found but the site has not been excavated.

East cemetery 
Discovered by accident by the Reisner expedition, the burial was intact, although the carefully sealed coffin proved to be empty.

Subsidiary pyramids 
On the southern end of the east side are four subsidiary pyramids The three that remain standing to almost full height are popularly known as the Queens' Pyramids (G1-a, G1-b and G1-c). The fourth, smaller satellite pyramid (G1-d), is so ruined that its existence was not suspected until the first course of stones and, later, the remains of the capstone were discovered during excavations in 1991–93.

Boats

Three boat-shaped pits are located east of the pyramid. They are large enough in size and shape to have held complete boats, though so shallow that any superstructure, if there ever was one, must have been removed or disassembled.

Two additional boat pits, long and rectangular in shape, were found south of the pyramid, still covered with slabs of stone weighing up to 15 tons.

The first of these was discovered in May 1954 by the Egyptian archaeologist Kamal el-Mallakh. Inside were 1,224 pieces of wood, the longest  in length, the shortest . These were entrusted to a boat builder, Haj Ahmed Yusuf, who worked out how the pieces fit together. The entire process, including conservation and straightening of the warped wood, took fourteen years. The boat is now in the Grand Egyptian Museum.

During construction of this museum in the 1980s, the second sealed boat pit was discovered. It was left unopened until 2011 when excavation began on the boat.

Pyramid town 
A notable construction flanking the Giza pyramid complex is a cyclopean stone wall, the Wall of the Crow. Mark Lehner discovered a worker's town outside of the wall, otherwise known as "The Lost City", dated by pottery styles, seal impressions and stratigraphy to have been constructed and occupied sometime during the reigns of Khafre (2520–2494 BC) and Menkaure (2490–2472 BC). In the early 21st century, Lehner and his team made several discoveries, including what appears to have been a thriving port, suggesting the town and associated living quarters, which consisted of barracks called "galleries", may not have been for the pyramid workers after all, but rather for the soldiers and sailors who used the port. In light of this new discovery, as to where then the pyramid workers may have lived, Lehner suggested the alternative possibility they may have camped on the ramps he believes were used to construct the pyramids, or possibly at nearby quarries.

In the early 1970s, the Australian archaeologist Karl Kromer excavated a mound in the South Field of the plateau. It contained artefacts including mudbrick seals of Khufu, which Kromer identified with an artisans' settlement. Mudbrick buildings just south of Khufu's Valley Temple contained mud sealings of Khufu and have been suggested to be a settlement serving the cult of Khufu after his death. A worker's cemetery used at least between Khufu's reign and the end of the Fifth Dynasty was discovered south of the Wall of the Crow by Hawass in 1990.

Looting
Authors Bob Brier and Hoyt Hobbs claim that "all the pyramids were robbed" by the New Kingdom, when the construction of royal tombs in the Valley of the Kings began. Joyce Tyldesley states that the Great Pyramid itself "is known to have been opened and emptied by the Middle Kingdom", before the Arab caliph Al-Ma'mun entered the pyramid around 820 AD.

I. E. S. Edwards discusses Strabo's mention that the pyramid "a little way up one side has a stone that may be taken out, which being raised up there is a sloping passage to the foundations". Edwards suggested that the pyramid was entered by robbers after the end of the Old Kingdom and sealed and then reopened more than once until Strabo's door was added. He adds: "If this highly speculative surmise be correct, it is also necessary to assume either that the existence of the door was forgotten or that the entrance was again blocked with facing stones", in order to explain why al-Ma'mun could not find the entrance. Scholars such as Gaston Maspero and Flinders Petrie have noted that evidence for a similar door has been found at the Bent Pyramid of Dashur.

Herodotus visited Egypt in the 5th century BC and recounts a story that he was told concerning vaults under the pyramid built on an island where the body of Khufu lies. Edwards notes that the pyramid had "almost certainly been opened and its contents plundered long before the time of Herodotus" and that it might have been closed again during the Twenty-sixth Dynasty of Egypt when other monuments were restored. He suggests that the story told to Herodotus could have been the result of almost two centuries of telling and retelling by pyramid guides.

See also

 Ancient Egypt in mathematics and architecture
 Index of Egypt-related articles
 List of Egyptian pyramids
 List of largest monoliths, including a section on calculating the weight of megaliths
 List of tallest freestanding structures
 List of tallest structures built before the 20th century
 Pyramidology

Notes

References

Bibliography

Further reading

External links

 
 Building the Khufu Pyramid
 
 

 
Buildings and structures completed in the 26th century BC
Pyramids of the Fourth Dynasty of Egypt
Former world's tallest buildings
Giza pyramid complex
Khufu
Seven Wonders of the Ancient World
Buildings and structures in Giza
Tourist attractions in Egypt